Streptomyces mirabilis is a bacterium species from the genus of Streptomyces. Streptomyces mirabilis produces miramycin and nitroreductase. Streptomyces mirabilis has a very high resistance against nickel.

See also 
 List of Streptomyces species

References

Further reading

External links
Type strain of Streptomyces mirabilis at BacDive -  the Bacterial Diversity Metadatabase	

mirabilis
Bacteria described in 1952